Larry Stewart (born March 2, 1959) is an American country music singer, best known for his role as lead singer of the country pop band Restless Heart. In 1993, Stewart left the band in pursuit of a solo career, recording four solo albums and charting eight singles on the Billboard Hot Country Singles & Tracks (now Hot Country Songs) charts before reuniting with Restless Heart in 2002. His highest-charting solo single was "Alright Already", which peaked at No. 5 in 1993.

Biography
Stewart moved to Nashville, Tennessee, in the 1980s in pursuit of a career in baseball. Although he had received an athletic scholarship from Belmont University in Nashville, he decided to focus on a career in music instead. After finding work as a demo singer, Larry joined the group Restless Heart in 1984 at the recommendation of the band's keyboardist Dave Innis, with whom Stewart had attended college. Between 1985 and 1993, Restless Heart charted 18 Top 40 singles on the U.S. Billboard Hot Country Singles & Tracks chart (including six Number Ones, as well as one single that was released only to the Adult Contemporary format). Stewart left the group in 1991 in pursuit of a solo career. The band continued for four more years without him, trading off lead vocals among the other members.

Solo career
Stewart released his solo debut album on the RCA Nashville label in 1993. Titled Down the Road, the album produced a Top 5 country hit in the single "Alright Already," along with a number 34 follow-up, "I'll Cry Tomorrow," and "We Can Love," which peaked at 62. This album also included a cover of Kevin Welch's 1989 single "I Came Straight to You", and the song "When I Close My Eyes", which was later a Top 5 hit in 1996 for Kenny Chesney.

In 1994, the same year that Restless Heart disbanded, Stewart made two contributions to Faith Hill's debut album Take Me as I Am, co-writing the single "But I Will" with Troy Seals and singing duet vocals on "I've Got This Friend". Later that year, he moved to Columbia Records, releasing Heart Like a Hurricane. The album accounted for three more singles – the title track, followed by the Vince Gill co-write "Losing Your Love" and "Rockin' the Rock" — all of which failed to make Top 40 on the US country charts, although "Losing Your Love" reached number 21 on the RPM country singles charts Canada.

Why Can't You, Stewart's third album was released in 1996, also on Columbia. Its title track reached number 46, followed by the number 70 "Always a Woman". After this album, Stewart briefly reunited with all of the members of Restless Heart (save for Innis) to record new tracks for a Greatest Hits album, but disbanded again soon afterward. Stewart released his fourth solo album, Learning to Breathe, in 1999 on independent Windham Hill Records, although this album did not account for any chart singles.

Restless Heart Reunion
In 2004, Stewart and the other four members of Restless Heart officially reunited to record the album Still Restless on Audium Entertainment, a branch of Koch Records (now E1 Music). On most of the tracks, Stewart again assumed his role as lead singer. Still Restless produced a Top 30 hit in the single "Feel My Way to You", but Koch Records closed the Audium label in early 2005. He has remained with Restless Heart since.

Stewart joined Nashville's Breezewood Productions in 2014 as chief operating officer focusing on promising new talent while continuing to bring music through his association with Restless Heart as well as a modern solo career.

Discography

Albums

Singles

Music videos

References

1959 births
American country singer-songwriters
Country musicians from Kentucky
Living people
Musicians from Paducah, Kentucky
RCA Records Nashville artists
Columbia Records artists
Restless Heart members
Windham Hill Records artists
Singer-songwriters from Kentucky